Mera monster, Alfons! is a 1992 children's book by Gunilla Bergström. As a radio-drama it aired on SR P4 on 5 August 2004.

Plot
Alfons is about to babysit a little guy called "Småtting". When Alfons is about to tell a story about a chicken, Småtting instead wants to hear about monsters, frightening Småtting. Finally, Småtting wants to hear a fairytale about a chicken instead.

References

1992 children's books
Fiction about monsters
Rabén & Sjögren books
Works by Gunilla Bergström